Ngairea is a genus of small air-breathing land snails, terrestrial pulmonate gastropod mollusks in the family Charopidae.

Species
Species within the genus Ngairea include:
 Ngairea canaliculata 
 Ngairea corticicola 
 Ngairea dorrigoensis 
 Ngairea levicostata 
 Ngairea murphyi

References

 
Charopidae
Gastropod genera
Gastropods of Australia
Endemic fauna of Australia
Taxonomy articles created by Polbot